Khylee Quince is a New Zealand lawyer and academic in the field of criminal law.

Biography
Quince practised in criminal and family law for three years, and in 1998 was appointed to the University of Auckland Law School. She teaches criminal law, advanced criminal law and youth justice.

In 2014, she and Alison Cleland co-authored Youth Justice in Aotearoa New Zealand and she has contributed to many legal texts including Feminist Judgments of Aotearoa New Zealand.

In 2020, Quince was appointed Dean of Law at Auckland University of Technology. She is the first dean of law of Māori descent at a New Zealand university.

Quince is of Māori descent, and affiliates to Te Roroa, Ngāpuhi and Ngāti Porou iwi.

References

External links 
 

Living people
Academic staff of the University of Auckland
Academic staff of the Auckland University of Technology
20th-century New Zealand lawyers
New Zealand women academics
Year of birth missing (living people)
New Zealand Māori academics
New Zealand Māori women academics
New Zealand Māori women lawyers
New Zealand Māori lawyers
Te Roroa people
Ngāpuhi people
Ngāti Porou people